Route 36 is a  north–south state highway in southeastern Massachusetts. Its southern terminus is at Route 106 in Halifax and its northern terminus is at Route 14 in Pembroke.

Route description

From its terminus at Route 106 in Halifax, Route 36 abuts the eastern shore of East Monponsett Pond. The highway then crosses the MBTA Commuter Rail at Halifax station. The highway runs near Silver Lake to the west and crosses Route 27 before ending at Route 14 just south of Pembroke Center.
This road is locally famous as the location of the former Hobomock Inn, a tavern linked to the famous Massachusetts politician, James Michael Curley. The legend is that Curley designated this rural road as a state highway so that his cronies from Boston could find it more easily following state highway signage. It is also a fact that after it was so designated snow removal for Route 36 became a state, rather than town, responsibility.

Major intersections

See also

References

External links

036
Halifax, Massachusetts
Pembroke, Massachusetts
Transportation in Plymouth County, Massachusetts